Michel Hiblot (born 19 April 1943) is a French former sprinter who competed in the 1964 Summer Olympics.

References

1943 births
Living people
French male sprinters
Olympic athletes of France
Athletes (track and field) at the 1964 Summer Olympics
Athletes (track and field) at the 1963 Mediterranean Games
Mediterranean Games gold medalists for France
Mediterranean Games medalists in athletics